WHIP (1350 AM) is a radio station broadcasting an oldies radio format. It is licensed in Mooresville, North Carolina, United States. The station is currently owned by Mooresville Media, Inc.  WHIP has been serving Mooresville, NC and Iredell County since 1950.  It has been owned and operated by Glenn and Martha Hamrick since 1976. WHIP also broadcasts Davidson Wildcats basketball and football games.

As of 2019, WHIP is also heard on W257EJ at 99.3 FM.

References

External links

HIP
Iredell County, North Carolina